Ian R. Wilkes (born May 25, 1965, in Muswellbrook, New South Wales, Australia) is a trainer in American Thoroughbred horse racing. He worked for leading Australian trainer Colin Hayes before taking a job in 1990 with trainer Carl Nafzger in the United States.

Now a resident of Louisville, Kentucky and training on his own, Wilkes earned his first Grade 1 win with Capt. Candyman Can in the 2009 King's Bishop Stakes at Saratoga Race Course.

Brothers with Australian NSW Horse Trainer Wayne Wilkes and uncle of Corinne Wilkes.

His most famous win to date is Fort Larned's win in the 2012 Breeders' Cup Classic run at Santa Anita Park in Arcadia, California.

References

1965 births
Living people
American horse trainers
People from New South Wales
Horse trainers from Louisville, Kentucky